Andrés José Túñez Arceo (born 15 March 1987) is a Venezuelan professional footballer who plays for Thai club BG Pathum United F.C. as a central defender.

Early years
Túñez was born in Caracas, Venezuela to José "Pepe" Túñez and Margarita Arceo, a family of Spanish immigrants from Galicia. Aged 7, his family would return to their hometown of Bertamirans, Ames.

Club career
Túñez began playing football at Colegio La Salle primary school, in the nearby city of Santiago de Compostela. Three years later, he continued his development by joining a football school – Escuela de Fútbol de Rosalia de Castro – where he would play in their youth teams for the following five years. After another youth spell at SD Compostela, he joined neighbours RC Celta de Vigo's Juvenil side.

In February 2010, following Jordi Figueras's transfer to FC Rubin Kazan, Túñez was promoted to the first team. He had spent nearly four seasons with the reserves in Segunda División B, and finished that campaign with 16 league appearances with the main squad, which competed in Segunda División.

Túñez contributed 29 games (all starts) in 2011–12, as Celta returned to La Liga after an absence of five years. He scored his only goal of the season on 28 January 2012, in a 1–0 away win against Girona FC.

Túñez played his first match in the Spanish top flight on 18 August 2012, starting in a 0–1 home loss to Málaga CF.

International career

On 24 February 2010, it was reported in the local papers that the Venezuela national team had approached Túñez's agent with an offer for the player to represent the nation. He made his international debut in September of the following year, playing injury time in a 0–1 friendly defeat with Argentina.

Club statistics

Honours
Buriram United
Thai League 1: 2014, 2015, 2017, 2018
Thai FA Cup: 2015
Kor Royal Cup: 2015, 2016
Thailand Champions Cup: 2019
Thai League Cup: 2015, 2016
Mekong Club Championship: 2015
Toyota Premier Cup: 2016

BG Pathum United
Thai League 1: 2020–21
 Thailand Champions Cup: 2022

Individual
Thai League 1 Best XI: 2020–21

References

External links

Celta de Vigo biography 

1987 births
Living people
Venezuelan people of Spanish descent
Venezuelan people of Galician descent
Footballers from Caracas
Spanish footballers
Venezuelan footballers
Association football defenders
La Liga players
Segunda División players
Segunda División B players
Celta de Vigo B players
RC Celta de Vigo players
Elche CF players
Israeli Premier League players
Beitar Jerusalem F.C. players
Andres Tunez
Andres Tunez
Andres Tunez
Venezuela international footballers
2015 Copa América players
Venezuelan expatriate footballers
Expatriate footballers in Spain
Expatriate footballers in Israel
Expatriate footballers in Thailand
Venezuelan expatriate sportspeople in Spain
Venezuelan expatriate sportspeople in Israel
Venezuelan expatriate sportspeople in Thailand